Meganeira or Meganira (Ancient Greek Μεγάνειρα) is a name that may refer to one of the following figures in Greek mythology:

Meganeira, daughter of Crocon and Saesara, and mother of Apheidas and Elatus by Arcas, son of Zeus and Callisto.
Meganeira, mother by Diomus of Alcyoneus. Together with her family, they lived in the city of Crisa at the foot of the Parnassus. This Alcyoneus was destined by lot to be sacrificed to the monster Sybaris on the basis of an oracle. However, the boy was saved by Eurybarus, who fell in love with the handsome lad and killed the monster.
Meganeira, same as Metaneira, wife of King Celeus of Eleusis.

Notes

References 

 Antoninus Liberalis, The Metamorphoses of Antoninus Liberalis translated by Francis Celoria (Routledge 1992). Online version at the Topos Text Project.
Apollodorus, The Library with an English Translation by Sir James George Frazer, F.B.A., F.R.S. in 2 Volumes, Cambridge, MA, Harvard University Press; London, William Heinemann Ltd. 1921. ISBN 0-674-99135-4. Online version at the Perseus Digital Library. Greek text available from the same website.
Pausanias, Description of Greece with an English Translation by W.H.S. Jones, Litt.D., and H.A. Ormerod, M.A., in 4 Volumes. Cambridge, MA, Harvard University Press; London, William Heinemann Ltd. 1918. . Online version at the Perseus Digital Library
Pausanias, Graeciae Descriptio. 3 vols. Leipzig, Teubner. 1903.  Greek text available at the Perseus Digital Library.

Set index articles on Greek mythology
Women in Greek mythology
Characters in Greek mythology
Arcadian mythology